Beryozovaya Polyana is a rural locality (a village) in Staronadezhdinsky Selsoviet, Blagoveshchensky District, Bashkortostan, Russia. The population was 27 as of 2010. There is 1 street.

Geography 
Beryozovaya Polyana is located 55 km northeast of Blagoveshchensk (the district's administrative centre) by road. Ust-Saldybash is the nearest rural locality.

References 

Rural localities in Blagoveshchensky District